Danger/Disease Control is a single by German industrial band X Marks the Pedwalk. It was released by Zoth Ommog in Europe in LP and CD formats.

Summary
Danger/Disease Control, is the second stand-alone single release by André Schmechta (Sevren Ni-Arb) and Jörg Böhme (Regan Eracs) under the band name X Marks the Pedwalk.  The vinyl version, which included only the first three tracks, was released under the name Danger by Zoth Ommog records with the catalogue number ZOT 11.  The CD version, which included all four songs, was also released by Zoth Ommog but with the catalogue number ZOT 11 CD, and was titled Disease Control.  The latter was X Marks the Pedwalk's first release available on compact disc.  All four songs were later released on the compilation CD Airbacktrax (released in the United States by Cleopatra Records under the name Abattoir, not to be confused with the single of the same name), and two of the songs, "Danger" and "Mirthless Knick-Knack", were used in part for the song on Drawback titled "Mi_X Marks the Pedwalk".

Track listing
 "Danger" – 6:19
 "(God Takes A) Photograph" – 3:57
 "Mirthless Knick-Knack" – 5:17
 "Scythe and Limbs" (CD only) – 3:15

Personnel
Sevren Ni-Arb
Regan Eracs

Industrial songs
1990 songs